Jason M. Osborne (born June 15, 1977) is a member of the New Hampshire House of Representatives. He represents Rockingham 4, comprising the towns of Auburn, Chester, and Sandown. In November 2020, the Republican caucus chose him to serve as the New Hampshire House Majority Leader.

Biography
Osborne is from Defiance, Ohio, where his family in 1964 founded Credit Adjustments, Inc. (CAI), a debt-collections company. Osborne joined the family firm in 1995 and worked as the CIO, and later CEO. With Osborne as CEO, CAI applied for and was granted more than $4 million in federal loans from the Paycheck Protection Program.

In 2021, CAI re-branded as Mammoth Tech. In 2022, Mammoth Tech. abruptly closed, laying off more than 500 employees. The company is currently facing a class-action lawsuit for failing to give notice. This includes rent payments, $1 million judgment to a staffing agency and another $181,000 decision on a management company. Two disability-discrimination suits have also been reportedly filed by former pregnant employees, one settled and one ongoing.

Political career
Osborne is a Republican. As majority leader of New Hampshire's House of Representatives, Osborne has been credited with achieving conservative legislative victories despite the Republican caucus’s slim majority.

Political positions

Gun Safety
In June 2022, Osborne proposed that firearms training be taught in at every grade level in public schools. He also described efforts to pass gun safety measures at the federal level as "fruity ideas."

Free state project 
Osborne moved to New Hampshire in 2010 from Ohio as part of the Free State Project.

Abortion
In 2017, Osborne voted for SB 66, which authorizes murder charges for an individual who causes the death of a fetus. In 2021, he voted for HB 625, which prohibits abortions after 24 weeks. He has also voted to repeal New Hampshire buffer-zone law and against requiring insurance plans that cover maternity benefits that include coverage for emergency or elective abortion services. In 2022, Osborne voted with Democrats to table HB 1477, a bill that would have prohibited abortion upon the detection of a fetal heartbeat.

Education
Despite indicating a belief that public-school staff are "keeping secrets from [parents]," and despite insinuating educators' impropriety around issues of gender identity and sexual preference, Osborne admitted that he "[doesn't] want to even pretend to know" that this is actually happening. This unsubstantiated claim is part of a nationwide Republican effort to smear educators as "grooming" students for sexual assault. Osborne's concerns, similar to those of fellow N.H. Republican Representative Terry Roy, don't seem to extend to former Representative Eric Schleien, who admitted to a 2018 assault on a 16 year old. Osborne and Schleien, fellow Free Staters, both began serving in the N.H. House of Representatives in the 2014 term. Schleien resigned prior to the 2018 elections amid unwelcome publicity of his crime. Osborne sat for an interview on Schleien's podcast in 2020.

Personal life
Osborne holds a PhD in economics from George Mason University. Osborne's children do not attend public school. Osborne's wife, Sharon, is the chair and director of Latitude Learning Resources, a non profit offering cross-curricular classes for home schoolers and other students.

Controversy
In 2022, web-forum posts from Osborne between 2007 and 2011 surfaced. In them, Osborne used racist slurs and sexist comments about women breastfeeding. He also appeared to argue for abolishing age-of-consent laws.

Electoral history

References 

1977 births
21st-century American politicians
Living people
Republican Party members of the New Hampshire House of Representatives